The 2022 Asian Boys' U18 Volleyball Championship was the 14th edition of the Asian Boys' U18 Volleyball Championship, a biennial international volleyball tournament organised by Asian Volleyball Confederation (AVC) with Islamic Republic of Iran Volleyball Federation (IRIVF). The tournament was held at Volleyball Federation Hall, Tehran, Iran from 15 to 22 August 2022.

This tournament is served as qualification tournament for the FIVB Volleyball Boys' U19 World Championship. The top four teams of the tournament qualified for the 2023 FIVB Volleyball Boys' U19 World Championship as the AVC representatives.

Players must be born on or after January 1, 2005.

Pools composition
Eight teams are divided into 2 Pools (Pool A & Pool B)
 Seeding for the host and top 3 teams from the previous event by serpentine system.
 Drawing of Lots for the remaining 4 teams (based on the previous ranking and zones).

Format
Preliminary Round: Round Robin to determind ranking.

Knockout Stage: All 8 teams enter to quarterfinal for cross elimination (A1:B4, B1:A4 etc) to determind champion.

Venue

Pool standing procedure
 Number of Victories
 Match points
 Set quotient
 Points quotient
 If the tie continues as per the point quotient between two teams, the priority will be given to the team which won the last match between them. When the tie in points quotient is between three or more teams, a new classification of these teams in the terms of points 1, 2 and 3 will be made taking into consideration only the matches in which they were opposed to each other.

Match won 3–0 or 3–1: 3 match points for the winner, 0 match points for the loser
Match won 3–2: 2 match points for the winner, 1 match point for the loser

Preliminary round
All times are Iran Daylight Time (UTC+04:30).

Pool A

|}

|}

Pool B

|}

|}

Final round
All times are Iran Daylight Time (UTC+4:30).

Quarterfinals
|}

5th–8th semifinals
|}

Semifinals
|}

7th place match
|}

5th place match
|}

3rd place match
|}

Final
|}

Final standing

Awards

Most Valuable Player

Best Setter

Best Outside Hitters

Best Middle Blockers

Best Opposite Spiker

Best Libero

See also
2022 Asian Girls' U18 Volleyball Championship
2022 Asian Men's U20 Volleyball Championship

References

External links
AVC
Team Roster

Asian U18 Championship
Volleyball
Volleyball
Asian Boys' U18 Volleyball Championship
Asian Boys' U18 Volleyball Championship
2022 in volleyball